Alain Lortie, commonly known under the pseudonym Daniel Sernine, is a French Canadian writer.

Biography 
Sernine obtained a Bachelor's in history in 1975 and a Master's in library science in 1977, both from the University of Montréal. He dedicated himself to writing in 1975, usually science-fiction, fantasy and books for young adults. His first short stories (Jalbert and La bouteille) were published in the magazine Solaris, then called Requiem, in 1975. In 1979, he published his first novel, Organisation Argus, as well as two collections of short stories, Les Contes de l'ombre and Légendes du vieux manoir.

Sernine has published novels and collections for adults, young adults, and children, and has won multiple awards for his works. He is also credited with a hundred articles and essays dedicated to the fields of writing, publishing, astronomy, science-fiction and fantasy.

Sernine has been the literary director of the Jeunesse-Pop collection at Éditions Médiaspaul since 1983 and of Lurelu since 1991, both dedicated to children's literature, as well as a member of the editorial board of Solaris.

Selected awards and honors

References

20th-century Canadian novelists
1955 births
Living people
Canadian science fiction writers
Canadian novelists in French
Writers from Montreal
Canadian male novelists
20th-century Canadian male writers